HMS TB 4 (originally named HMS Sandfly) was a Cricket-class coastal destroyer or torpedo-boat of the British Royal Navy. TB 4 was built by the shipbuilder J S White from 1905 to 1907. She served in the Dover Patrol in the First World War and survived the war. She ran aground on the way to be scrapped on 11 January 1921 and was broken up in situ.

Design
The Cricket class, known as Coastal Destroyers, was intended as a smaller and cheaper supplement to the large, fast, but expensive , particularly in coastal waters such as the English Channel. An initial order for twelve ships was placed by the Admiralty in May 1905 as part of the 1905–1906 shipbuilding programme, with five ships each ordered from Thornycroft and J. Samuel White and two from Yarrow.

The ships had turtleback forecastles and two funnels. Two oil-fuelled Yarrow water-tube boilers fed steam to three-stage Parsons steam turbines, driving three propeller shafts. The machinery was designed to give , with a speed of  specified.

Armament consisted of two 12-pounder (76 mm) 12 cwt guns, and three 18-inch (450 mm) torpedo tubes (in three single mounts). The ships had a crew of 39.

Service
The fourth of the coastal destroyers ordered from Whites under the 1905–1906 programme was laid down at J. Samuel White's Cowes shipyard on 18 September 1905,  and was launched as HMS Sandfly on 30 October 1906. In December 1906, it was announced by the British Admiralty that the coastal destroyers would be reclassified as torpedo boats, and would be known by numbers rather than names. Sandfly was therefore renamed TB 4. TB 4 was completed in April 1907.

The newly completed TB 4 was accepted from Whites and commissioned with a nucleus crew as a tender to the depot ship  at Portsmouth naval base on 17 April 1907.
Following the loss of the destroyer , which was sunk in a collision in the English Channel on 6 April 1909, TB 4 and  supported the salvage operations. In March 1912, TB 4s crew was used to carry out final sea trials on the destroyer , with TB 4 to recommission into the 4th Destroyer Flotilla on completion of these trials.

In 1912, four Patrol Flotillas were formed with torpedo boats and older destroyers, with the duties of preventing enemy minelaying or torpedo attacks on the east coast of Britain.  In February 1913, TB 4 was a member of the Eighth Flotilla, based at Chatham, but by January 1914, had transferred to the Seventh Flotilla, based at Devonport.

The Royal Navy mobilised on the eve of the outbreak of the First World War in August 1914, with TB 4 still part of the Seventh Flotilla as the flotilla moved to its war station on the east coast of England. In January 1915, TB 4 was listed as part of the 9th Flotilla, but by March had transferred to the 6th Destroyer Flotilla, part of the Dover Patrol.

On 17 November 1915, the hospital ship , carrying a load of sick and wounded soldiers back to Britain from France, struck a mine off Folkestone. Anglia took on a heavy list, but her engines were not shut down, so she continued to make significant way through the water, making rescue efforts more difficult. TB 4, under the command of Lieutenant-Commander H. P. Boxer, twice went alongside Anglia to rescue survivors and then picked up two boat loads of wounded from the sea, with TB 4 rescuing about 140 men in total, before taking them to Dover. Other survivors were rescued by the torpedo gunboat , the steamships Langdon and Channel Queen, and the collier , which also struck a mine and sank. A total of 168 lives were lost from Anglia, including 133 patients.

On the night of March 17/18 1917 Germany launched a major raid by torpedo boats based in Flanders against Allied defences and shipping in the English Channel. While two groups of torpedo boats were to operate against the Dover Barrage, four more were ordered to attack shipping on the Downs. The attack on the Dover Barrage sank the British destroyer  and badly damaged the destroyer . while the attack on the Downs sank the steamer  and damaged the naval drifter  before firing a few shells at Ramsgate, Broadstairs and St Peter's. TB 4, patrolling in support of the line of drifters guarding the Downs, spotted the German torpedo boats as they shelled targets on land, reported the sighting and attempted to pursue the German ships, which soon managed to outpace TB 4 which lost sight of the German torpedo boats. On the night of 26/27 April 1917, German torpedo boats launched another attack against the coast of Kent, shelling Margate, Ramsgate and Broadstairs, being engaged by the monitor , guardship for the Downs and a coast defence battery at North Foreland. TB 4 also spotted the German force, and after reporting it, attempted to get in position to deliver a torpedo attack, but the German force broke off the bombardment before any attack could be made.

TB 4 remained part of the 6th Flotilla at the end of the war on 11 November 1918. By March 1919, TB 4 was in reserve at Devonport, and by January 1920, was, together with most of the remaining torpedo boats, listed as being for sale. She was sold for scrap to the shipbreakers Thos. W. Ward on 7 October 1920, but ran aground near Westward Ho! on the way to the scrapyard on 11 January 1921 and was broken up in situ.

References

 

 

Ships built on the Isle of Wight
1906 ships
Torpedo boats of the Royal Navy